The Air Force Falcons men's lacrosse team represents the United States Air Force Academy in National Collegiate Athletic Association (NCAA) Division I college lacrosse. The program was created in 1967. Air Force plays its home games at Falcon Stadium, which has a capacity of 46,692. The Falcons played their first season in the ASUN Conference in spring 2022 after having played the previous six seasons in the Southern Conference, with previous conference membership in the Great Western Lacrosse League and the ECAC Lacrosse League. Through 2019, the team has an all–time record of 403–298.

The Falcons appeared in the first NCAA Division I Men's Lacrosse Championship in 1971, losing to Maryland 10–1. In 2014, Air Force won its first NCAA Men's Lacrosse Tournament game, defeating Richmond in a play-in game, 13–5, before falling to Duke, 20–9, in the first round.

In 2016, the Falcons joined the Southern Conference as an associate member for men's lacrosse, increasing the conference's membership to eight teams. Since then, Air Force has captured three regular-season conference championships and two conference tournament championships, with NCAA tournament appearances in 2016 and 2017.

After the 2021 season, Air Force men's lacrosse joined the newly reinstated men's lacrosse league of the ASUN Conference.

Season results
The following is a list of Air Force's results by season since it began NCAA lacrosse competition in 1971:

{| class="wikitable"

|- align="center"

†NCAA canceled 2020 collegiate activities due to COVID-19.

See also
 Joe Vasta

References

External links
Official website